The Embassy of the United Kingdom in Buenos Aires is the chief diplomatic mission of the United Kingdom in Argentina. The Embassy also represents the British Overseas Territories in Argentina.

It is located on Dr Luís Agote street in the Recoleta neighbourhood. The current British Ambassador to Argentina is Mark Kent.

There were previously British Consulates in the cities of Rosario, La Plata, Bahia Blanca, Santa Fe and Mendoza.

Due to the turbulent nature of Argentina–United Kingdom relations, the Embassy has frequently been the site of protests against the actions of the UK government, particularly over the Falkland Islands, over which Argentina claims sovereignty.

History
The British government acquired the building for use as an embassy in 1945, which had been built in 1917 as the residence of Carlos Madero, in an Edwardian style.
 

Between 1982 and 1990, following the Falklands War, there were no diplomatic relations between the UK and Argentina. Switzerland became the protecting power for the UK in Argentina, taking over responsibility not only for the former Embassy but two Consulates-General.

The former British Embassy building remained open, but was known as the British Interests Section of the Swiss Embassy in Buenos Aires and was staffed by Anglo Argentines. However, a small number of senior British diplomats remained.

The former Argentine Embassy in London came under the Brazilian flag during the same period.

Under the arrangement, the two Interests Sections were unable to have direct communications with their home governments, instead being required to communicate through their embassies of the protecting power, for example, the British Embassy in Berne, Switzerland.

Similarly, until 1989, the diplomats were unable to have direct contacts with their respective foreign ministries, instead having to go through the Swiss and Brazilian embassies.

The residence was visited by various members of the royal family, such as Prince Philip and Prince Andrew. Lady Di and 
Richard Branson spent their stays in the city at the residence.

See also
Argentina–United Kingdom relations
List of diplomatic missions in Argentina
List of Ambassadors of the United Kingdom to Argentina

References

Buenos Aires
United Kingdom
Buildings and structures in Buenos Aires
Argentina–United Kingdom relations